Kavarna Cove is a 2 km wide cove indenting for 1.2 km the south coast of Livingston Island (in the South Shetland Islands,  Antarctica) that is entered between Elephant Point and Bond Point.  It was named after the town of Kavarna in northeastern Bulgaria.

Location

See also
 List of Bulgarian toponyms in Antarctica

References
 Kavarna Cove. SCAR Composite Antarctic Gazetteer
 Bulgarian Antarctic Gazetteer. Antarctic Place-names Commission. (details in Bulgarian, basic data in English)

External links
 Kavarna Cove. Copernix satellite image

Coves of Livingston Island